Juan Aguilera Núñez (born 13 September 1985) is a Spanish professional footballer who plays as a central midfielder.

Club career
Born in Madrid, Aguilera began his career with amateurs Getafe CF B and CDA Navalcarnero, then played three years in the Segunda División B for another club in the Community of Madrid, CD Leganés. In 2008 he was transferred to Real Murcia, being assigned to the B team also at that level.

Aguilera made his debut with the first team on 9 January 2010, coming on as a second-half substitute in a 0–2 home loss against Elche CF. He appeared in a further three games for them during the season, as both the first and the second sides eventually suffered relegation.

Aguilera was Murcia's first choice in the 2010–11 campaign, in an immediate promotion. On 13 July 2015, after three years in the Super League Greece with Platanias FC, he signed for Indian Super League club Mumbai City FC.

On 23 February 2016, Aguilera returned to Spain and its division two after agreeing to a short-term deal with SD Huesca. He was a regular starter during 2017–18, as they achieved a first-ever promotion to La Liga.

Aguilera made his debut in the Spanish top tier at the age of 32 years and 11 months on 25 September 2018, replacing Cucho Hernández in a 3–0 defeat away to Atlético Madrid. On 3 July 2019, after suffering relegation, he signed a three-year contract with AD Alcorcón of the second division; he left in January 2022, as a free agent.

Career statistics

References

External links
 
 
 
 

1985 births
Living people
Spanish footballers
Footballers from Madrid
Association football midfielders
La Liga players
Segunda División players
Segunda División B players
Getafe CF B players
CDA Navalcarnero players
CD Leganés players
Real Murcia Imperial players
Real Murcia players
SD Huesca footballers
AD Alcorcón footballers
Super League Greece players
Platanias F.C. players
Indian Super League players
Mumbai City FC players
Spanish expatriate footballers
Expatriate footballers in Greece
Expatriate footballers in India
Spanish expatriate sportspeople in Greece
Spanish expatriate sportspeople in India